David A. Savitz is a professor of Community Health in the Epidemiology Section of the Program in Public Health, Vice President for Research, and Professor of Obstetrics and Gynecology, at The Alpert Medical School of Brown University, and Associate Director for Perinatal Research in The Department of Obstetrics and Gynecology at Women & Infants Hospital, both in Providence, Rhode Island.
Savitz is the author of Interpreting epidemiologic evidence: strategies for study design and analysis and more than 275 peer-reviewed articles. He was elected to the Institute of Medicine in 2007.

Biography
Savitz graduated from Brandeis University with a B.A. degree in psychology in 1975. He completed his M.S. degree in preventive medicine at Ohio State University in 1978, and earned his Ph.D. degree in epidemiology from the University of Pittsburgh Graduate School of Public Health in 1982.

Until 1985, Savitz was Assistant Professor in the Department of Preventive Medicine and Biometrics at the University of Colorado School of Medicine. He then moved to the University of North Carolina; he was appointed Professor and Chair of the University's Department of Epidemiology in 1996, a position he held until 2005.

In January 2006, he joined The Mount Sinai Medical Center as Professor of Preventive Medicine and Director of the Epidemiology, Biostatistics, and Prevention Institute.

Savitz is a former editor at the American Journal of Epidemiology and a member of the Epidemiology and Disease Control - 1 Study Section of the National Institutes of Health. He is a former president of the Society for Epidemiologic Research and the Society for Pediatric and Perinatal Epidemiologic Research and the North American Regional Councilor for the International Epidemiological Association. He is currently an editor at the journal Epidemiology.

Interests include a range of epidemiological, pre- and postnatal and cancer issues, including the connection between miscarriage and C8/C8S, links between alcohol consumption and breast cancer, the effect of drinking water DBPs on fetal survival, links between caffeine and miscarriage and exposure to chemicals and the risk of breast cancer.

In September 2010, Savitz joined Brown University's Alpert Medical School as Professor of Community Health (Epidemiology Section) and Obstetrics and Gynecology.  In addition, he joined The Department of Obstetrics and Gynecology at Women & Infants Hospital of Rhode Island as associate director of the Division of Research.

Active grants
Savitz’s research interests include a range of topics in perinatal and pediatric health, cancer, and the environment. These include environmental influences on miscarriage, caffeine and pregnancy outcome, and environmental influences on cancer in children and adults.
He has completed 47 grants and is principal investigator or investigator on the following active grants:

Books
Bertollini R, Lebowitz MD, Saracci R, Savitz DA (editors).  Environmental epidemiology.  Exposure and disease.  Proceedings of an international workshop on priorities in environmental epidemiology.  Boca Raton, FL: Lewis Publishers, 1995. 
Steenland K, Savitz DA (editors).  Topics in environmental epidemiology.  New York, NY: Oxford University Press, 1997. 
Savitz DA. Interpreting epidemiologic evidence: strategies for study design and analysis. New York, NY: Oxford University Press, 2003.

Publications
Partial list:
Decline in smoking during pregnancy in New York City, 1995-2005. Stein CR, Ellis JA, Savitz DA, Vichinsky L, Perl SB. Public Health Rep. 2009 Nov-Dec;124(6):841-9. 
Stress questionnaires and stress biomarkers during pregnancy. Harville EW, Savitz DA, Dole N, Herring AH, Thorp JM. J Women's Health (Larchmt). 2009 Sep;18(9):1425-33. 
Maternal ethnic ancestry and adverse perinatal outcomes in New York City. Stein CR, Savitz DA, Janevic T, Ananth CV, Kaufman JS, Herring AH, Engel SM. Am J Obstet Gynecol. 2009 Dec;201(6):584.e1-9. Epub 2 September 2009. 
Serum levels of perfluorooctanoic acid and perfluorooctane sulfonate and pregnancy outcome. Stein CR, Savitz DA, Dougan M. Am J Epidemiol. 1 October 2009;170(7):837-46. Epub 19 August 2009.  
Multiple myeloma in world trade center responders: a case series. Moline JM, Herbert R, Crowley L, Troy K, Hodgman E, Shukla G, Udasin I, Luft B, Wallenstein S, Landrigan P, Savitz DA. J Occup Environ Med. 2009 Aug;51(8):896-902. 
Epidemiologic evidence on mobile phones and tumor risk: a review. Ahlbom A, Feychting M, Green A, Kheifets L, Savitz DA, Swerdlow AJ; ICNIRP (International Commission for Non-Ionizing Radiation Protection) Standing Committee on Epidemiology. Epidemiology. 2009 Sep;20(5):639-52. 
Self-reported vitamin supplementation in early pregnancy and risk of miscarriage. Hasan R, Olshan AF, Herring AH, Savitz DA, Siega-Riz AM, Hartmann KE. Am J Epidemiol. 1 June 2009;169(11):1312-8. Epub 16 April 2009. 
Prevalence of uterine leiomyomas in the first trimester of pregnancy: an ultrasound-screening study. Laughlin SK, Baird DD, Savitz DA, Herring AH, Hartmann KE. Obstet Gynecol. 2009 Mar;113(3):630-5. 
Maternal smoking, preeclampsia, and infant health outcomes in New York City, 1995-2003. Engel SM, Janevic TM, Stein CR, Savitz DA. Am J Epidemiol. 1 January 2009;169(1):33-40. Epub 10 November 2008. 
Comparison of gestational age at birth based on last menstrual period and ultrasound during the first trimester. Hoffman CS, Messer LC, Mendola P, Savitz DA, Herring AH, Hartmann KE. Paediatr Perinat Epidemiol. 2008 Nov;22(6):587-96. 
Alteration in vaginal microflora, douching prior to pregnancy, and preterm birth. Thorp JM Jr, Dole N, Herring AH, McDonald TL, Eucker B, Savitz DA, Kaczor D. Paediatr Perinat Epidemiol. 2008 Nov;22(6):530-7. 
Variability and predictors of changes in water use during pregnancy. Forssén UM, Wright JM, Herring AH, Savitz DA, Nieuwenhuijsen MJ, Murphy PA. J Expo Sci Environ Epidemiol. 2009 Sep;19(6):593-602. Epub 1 October 2008. 
The risk for impaired learning-related abilities in childhood and educational attainment among adults born near-term. Nomura Y, Halperin JM, Newcorn JH, Davey C, Fifer WP, Savitz DA, Brooks-Gunn J. J Pediatr Psychol. 2009 May;34(4):406-18. Epub 15 September 2008. 
Invited commentary: disaggregating preterm birth to determine etiology. Savitz DA. Am J Epidemiol. 1 November 2008;168(9):990-2; discussion 993-4. Epub 27 August 2008. 
Design issues in small-area studies of environment and health. Elliott P, Savitz DA. Environ Health Perspect. 2008 Aug;116(8):1098-104. 
Drinking water disinfection by-product exposure and fetal growth. Hoffman CS, Mendola P, Savitz DA, Herring AH, Loomis D, Hartmann KE, Singer PC, Weinberg HS, Olshan AF. Epidemiology. 2008 Sep;19(5):729-37.

References

External links
The Mount Sinai Hospital homepage
The Mount Sinai School of Medicine homepage
Disease Prevention and Public Health Institute at The Mount Sinai Medical Center

American medical academics
Brandeis University alumni
Cancer researchers
American epidemiologists
Living people
Members of the National Academy of Medicine
Icahn School of Medicine at Mount Sinai faculty
Ohio State University College of Medicine alumni
University of Pittsburgh School of Public Health alumni
University of Colorado Denver faculty
Year of birth missing (living people)
Brown University faculty